Khilkhil Kazi is a Bangladeshi singer and organizer. She is the eldest daughter of elocutionist Kazi Sabyasachi and granddaughter of Bangladesh National Poet Kazi Nazrul Islam. She was awarded Nazrul Award 2013 by the Nazrul Institute.

References 

Living people
21st-century Bangladeshi women singers
21st-century Bangladeshi singers
Place of birth missing (living people)
Kazi Nazrul Islam
Year of birth missing (living people)